Luxembourg made its Paralympic Games début at the 1976 Summer Paralympics in Toronto, Ontario, Canada. The country was represented by two competitors in archery, and one in swimming.

Archery

Swimming

See also
Luxembourg at the Paralympics
Luxembourg at the 1976 Summer Olympics

References

Nations at the 1976 Summer Paralympics
1976
Summer Paralympics